In Greek mythology, Erysichthon (Ancient Greek: Ἐρυσίχθων ὁ Θεσσαλός means "earth-tearer"), also anglicised as Erisichthon, was a king of Thessaly. He was sometimes called Aethon.

Family 
Erysichthon was the son of King Triopas possibly by Hiscilla, daughter of Myrmidon and thus, brother of Iphimedeia and Phorbas. 

In some accounts, however, he was called instead the son of Myrmidon possibly by Peisidice, daughter of Aeolus and Enarete, and thus, brother to Antiphus, Actor, Dioplethes, Eupolemeia and possibly Hiscilla as well.

Erysichthon was the father of Mestra, the shapeshifting lover of Poseidon.

Mythology

Callimachus 
Erysichthon once took twenty men with him to the sacred grove of Demeter, where he cut down a black poplar tree where tree nymphs gathered around to dance; the tree groaned as he wounded it. Demeter, feeling the tree's discomfort at once, flew down at the grove taking a mortal woman's form, where she advised Erysichthon against cutting down the tree, warning him of Demeter's wrath. Erysichthon then rudely told her to leave, threatening to strike her down with his axe and saying he needed the tree to build an extension for his house where he could hold feasts. Demeter then resumed her divine form, and promised revenge. She sent insatiable hunger to him (Limos, here a male deity), and no matter how much he ate and drank, he could never satisfy his hunger or his thirst (inflicted on him by Dionysus, who was just as angry as Demeter was at him). Even his parents refused to visit him, and he ended up wasting all his wealth for food, becoming a beggar living off of the crumbs thrown at him by those passing by.

Ovid 
Erysichthon once ordered all trees in the sacred grove of Demeter to be cut down. One huge oak was covered with votive wreaths, a symbol of every prayer Demeter had granted, and so the men refused to cut it down. Erysichthon grabbed an axe and cut it down himself, killing a dryad nymph in the process. The nymph's dying words were a curse on Erysichthon.

Demeter responded to the nymph's curse and punished him by entreating Limos (here a female deity), the spirit of unrelenting and insatiable hunger, to place herself in his stomach. Food acted like fuel on a fire: The more he ate, the hungrier he got. Erysichthon sold all his possessions to buy food, but was still hungry. At last he sold his own daughter Mestra into slavery. The latter was freed from slavery by her former lover Poseidon, who gave her the gift of shape-shifting into any creature at will to escape her bonds. Erysichthon used her shape-shifting ability to sell her numerous times to make money to feed himself, but no amount of food was enough. Eventually, Erysichthon ate himself in hunger. Nothing of him remained the following morning.

Hyginus 
Hyginus, calling him Triopas (which is his father's name in other versions), wrote that Erysichthon tore down a temple of Demeter wishing to build a roof for his house. She then sent hunger to him as with all other versions, that no amount of food could satisfy. Near the end of his life a snake was sent to plague him, and afterwards was put among the stars (the constellation Ophiuchus) by Demeter herself, as was the snake, to continue to inflict its punishment on Erysichthon.

Gigantomachy 
On the Pergamon Altar, which depicts the battle of the gods against the Giants (also known as the Gigantomachy), surviving remains depict what seems to have been Demeter fighting a Giant labelled "Erysichthon," like the Thessalian king.

Mythic interpretation 

Palaephatus, who was trying to rationalize the Greek myths in his On Unbelievable Tales, wrote that Erysichthon was a rich Thessalian man who became poor. He had a beautiful daughter, the Mestra. Men who wanted to marry her gave horses, cows, sheep or whatever Mestra wanted. The Thessalians seeing the livelihood of Erysichthon piling up said "from Mestra came horse and cow and other things" (ἐγένετο ἐκ Μήστρας αὐτῷ καὶ ἵππος καὶ βοῦς καὶ τἄλλα), and this is how the myth developed.

Müller thinks that the traditions concerning Triopas and Erysichthon (from έρευείρη, gobigo) belong to an agricultural religion, which, at the same time, refers to the infernal regions.

See also
Polyphagia
Tarrare
Charles Domery
 Erysichthon of Attica

Notes

References

Primary sources 
 Apollonius Rhodius, Argonautica translated by Robert Cooper Seaton (1853-1915), R. C. Loeb Classical Library Volume 001. London, William Heinemann Ltd, 1912. Online version at the Topos Text Project.
 Apollonius Rhodius, Argonautica. George W. Mooney. London. Longmans, Green. 1912. Greek text available at the Perseus Digital Library.
 Athenaeus of Naucratis, The Deipnosophists or Banquet of the Learned. London. Henry G. Bohn, York Street, Covent Garden. 1854. Online version at the Perseus Digital Library.
 Athenaeus of Naucratis, Deipnosophistae. Kaibel. In Aedibus B.G. Teubneri. Lipsiae. 1887. Greek text available at the Perseus Digital Library.
 Callimachus, Callimachus and Lycophron with an English translation by A. W. Mair ; Aratus, with an English translation by G. R. Mair, London: W. Heinemann, New York: G. P. Putnam 1921. Internet Archive
 Callimachus, Works. A.W. Mair. London: William Heinemann; New York: G.P. Putnam's Sons. 1921. Greek text available at the Perseus Digital Library.
 Gaius Julius Hyginus, Astronomica from The Myths of Hyginus translated and edited by Mary Grant. University of Kansas Publications in Humanistic Studies. Online version at the Topos Text Project.
 The Homeric Hymns and Homerica with an English Translation by Hugh G. Evelyn-White. Homeric Hymns. Cambridge, MA.,Harvard University Press; London, William Heinemann Ltd. 1914. Online version at the Perseus Digital Library. Greek text available from the same website.
 Lycophron, The Alexandra  translated by Alexander William Mair. Loeb Classical Library Volume 129. London: William Heinemann, 1921. Online version at the Topos Text Project.
 Lycophron, Alexandra translated by A.W. Mair. London: William Heinemann; New York: G.P. Putnam's Sons. 1921. Greek text available at the Perseus Digital Library.
 Pseudo-Apollodorus, The Library with an English Translation by Sir James George Frazer, F.B.A., F.R.S. in 2 Volumes, Cambridge, MA, Harvard University Press; London, William Heinemann Ltd. 1921. . Online version at the Perseus Digital Library. Greek text available from the same website.
 Publius Ovidius Naso, Metamorphoses translated by Brookes More (1859-1942). Boston, Cornhill Publishing Co. 1922. Online version at the Perseus Digital Library.
 Publius Ovidius Naso, Metamorphoses. Hugo Magnus. Gotha (Germany). Friedr. Andr. Perthes. 1892. Latin text available at the Perseus Digital Library.

Secondary source

External links 
 Images of Erysichthon in the Warburg Institute Iconographic Database 

Mythological cannibals
Princes in Greek mythology
Kings in Greek mythology
Family of Canace
Metamorphoses characters
Thessalian characters in Greek mythology
Thessalian mythology
Deeds of Demeter
Polyphagia
Gigantes